The 1951–52 Scottish League Cup was the sixth season of Scotland's second football knockout competition. The competition was won by Dundee, who defeated Rangers in the Final.

First round

Group 1

Group 2

Group 3

Group 4

Group 5

Group 6

Group 7

Group 8

Quarter-finals

First Leg

Second Leg

Semi-finals

Final

References

General

Specific

1951–52 in Scottish football
1950-51